Anna Smashnova-Pistolesi was the defending champion, but was forced to retire in her second round match against Sandra Kleinová due to a hamstring injury.

Alicia Molik won the title by defeating Tatiana Perebiynis 6–1, 6–1 in the final.

Seeds

Draw

Finals

Top half

Bottom half

References

External links
 Official results archive (ITF)
 Official results archive (WTA)

Singles
Nordea Nordic Light Open
Nordic